(Spanish, 'Saint Gregory's High School') is a Chilean high school located in Rosario, Rengo, Cachapoal Province, Chile. The school was created on 1 March 2003.

References 

Educational institutions established in 2003
Secondary schools in Chile
Schools in Cachapoal Province
2003 establishments in Chile